Basundhara may refer to:
 Basundhara (2009 film), an Assamese-language Indian film
 Bosundhora, 1977 Bengali-language Bangladeshi film
Bashundhara Ad-din Medical College, a joint venture medical college between Bashundhara Group and Ad-din Foundation
Bashundhara City, a shopping mall in Bangladesh 
 Bashundhara Group, a Bangladeshi conglomerate 
Bashundhara Islamic Research Center
Bashundhara Kings, a football team in Bangladesh 
Bashundhara Kings Women, a women's football team 
 Bashundhara Residential Area, Dhaka, Bangladesh